Gal Mesika (born June 29, 1988) is an Israeli American football and association football player.

Biography
Gal Mesika was born in Herzliya to a Tunisian-Jewish family. His father was also a footballer who played for Maccabi Herzliya and also served as the CEO of the club from 1996 to 2009.

Sports career
In association football he is a goalkeeper who has played for many teams including Hapoel Ra'anana in 2013-2014 Maccabi Netanya in 2015. He was the also previously the starting goalkeeper for the Israel national under-19 football team.

In 2015, Mesika made the transition into playing American football, and joined the Israel national American football team as a placekicker. After seeing Mesika play, Robert Kraft stated he expected to soon see an Israeli play in the NFL. 
In February 2016 Mesika was invited to be the first ever Israeli to try out for the NFL.

See also
Sports in Israel

References

External links
 

1988 births
Living people
Israeli Jews
Israeli footballers
Israeli people of Tunisian-Jewish descent
Maccabi Herzliya F.C. players
Hakoah Maccabi Amidar Ramat Gan F.C. players
Maccabi Kafr Kanna F.C. players
Hapoel Kfar Shalem F.C. players
Hapoel Bnei Lod F.C. players
Hapoel Ra'anana A.F.C. players
Maccabi Ironi Amishav Petah Tikva F.C. players
F.C. Kafr Qasim players
Maccabi Netanya F.C. players
Israeli Premier League players
Liga Leumit players
Association football goalkeepers
Footballers from Herzliya
American football placekickers